The 1958–59 Illinois Fighting Illini men’s basketball team represented the University of Illinois.

Regular season
University of Illinois' head coach, Harry Combes and his Fighting Illini basketball team once again led the Big Ten in wins for a decade with a 165-64 record in the 1950s. The Illini’s winning percentage, .721, ranked 11th
nationally.  Additionally, the Associated Press began its basketball poll in 1949 with United Press International adding its poll in 1951 and from 1951-56 the Illini finished the season ranked in the Top 20 nationally every year. Illinois’
highest final ranking in the 1950s was second in both polls in 1952.

The 1958-59 team utilized several returning lettermen including the leading scorer, team "captain" and team "MVP" Roger Taylor. It also saw the return of Mannie Jackson, Govoner Vaughn, Bruce Bunkenberg, Al Gosnell, Lou Landt and Ed Perry. The Illini finished the season with a conference record of 7 wins and 7 losses, finishing tied for 5th place in the Big Ten. They would finish with an overall record of 12 wins and 10 losses. During the season, the Illini would play Kentucky, the No. 1 ranked team in the nation, at a Freedom Hall in Louisville.  The outcome of this game would be a 75-76 loss. The starting lineup included John Wessels at the center position, Roger Taylor and Mannie Jackson at guard and Govoner Vaughn, Ed Perry and Al Gosnell at the forward slots.

Roster

Source

Schedule
												
Source																
												

|-
!colspan=12 style="background:#DF4E38; color:white;"| Non-Conference regular season

|-
!colspan=9 style="background:#DF4E38; color:#FFFFFF;"|Big Ten regular season

|-					

Bold Italic connotes conference game

Player stats

Awards and honors
Roger Taylor
Converse Honorable Mention All-American
Team Most Valuable Player

Team players drafted into the NBA

Rankings

References

Illinois Fighting Illini
Illinois Fighting Illini men's basketball seasons
1958 in sports in Illinois
1959 in sports in Illinois